Paul Ingram may refer to:
 Paul Ingram (nuclear disarmament expert)
 Paul Ingram, principal in the Thurston County ritual abuse case